The South African Football Association (SAFA) Awards are awards given to football players and coaches of South African origin by the South African Football Association. The awards were formed in 2008.

Player of the year

Young Player of the Year

Women's Player of the Year

Young Women's Player of the Year

Coach of the Year

References

2008 establishments in South Africa
Awards established in 2008
South African soccer trophies and awards
Annual events in South Africa